Li Donghua (born 10 December 1967) is a gymnast who represented his adopted country of Switzerland at the  1996 Summer Olympics in Atlanta, where he won the gold medal on the pommel horse.

Career
Li began his gymnastics career competing for China, and won a national title on the pommel horse in 1987. However, a neck injury prevented him from making the Chinese team for the 1988 Olympics.

While recovering from his injury, Li met Esperanza Friedli, a Swiss national who was backpacking in China. When he told his coaches he was to marry her, they told him to cut off the relationship or he would not be able to compete. He refused, and the couple left China for Lucerne.

Li went on to win the Swiss national title on pommel horse from 1989 to 1992, and the all-around national title in 1993. However, because he was not a Swiss national during that time, those results were not official. In 1994, he became a Swiss citizen and began competing for the country internationally.

At the 1994 World Artistic Gymnastics Championship, Li won a bronze medal on pommel horse. The next year, he won gold on the same event. In 1996, at the age of 28, he won both the European and Olympic pommel horse titles. Li was the first Olympic medalist for Switzerland in gymnastics since 1952.

Personal life 
Li and Friedli were married in 1988 and divorced in 2004. Li later married Qiang Huang. He has two children.

References

External links

 
Official Homepage (German)
List of competitive results at Gymn Forum
Love Conquers All, Eventually

1967 births
Living people
Chinese male artistic gymnasts
Swiss male artistic gymnasts
Olympic gymnasts of Switzerland
Gymnasts at the 1996 Summer Olympics
Olympic gold medalists for Switzerland
World champion gymnasts
Medalists at the World Artistic Gymnastics Championships
Medalists at the 1996 Summer Olympics
Sportspeople from Chengdu
Olympic medalists in gymnastics
Gymnasts from Sichuan
Chinese emigrants to Switzerland
Swiss sportspeople of Chinese descent